Leandro Cordeiro de Lima Silva (born 25 September 1993), commonly known as Leandrinho, is a Brazilian footballer who plays as a central midfielder for Portuguese club Mafra.

Club career

Santos
Born in Espinosa, Minas Gerais, Leandrinho joined Santos FC's youth system in 2010, aged 16. He made his first team debut on 5 August 2012, in a 0–3 away loss against Naútico for the Série A championship.

Leandrinho was later praised by manager Muricy Ramalho due to his performances, but was demoted to the under-20s, helping the side to win the category's Campeonato Paulista. He scored his first professional goal on 10 July 2013, netting his side's only in a 1–1 home draw against CRAC, for that year's Copa do Brasil.

On 16 August 2013, after being definitely promoted to the main squad by manager Claudinei Oliveira, Leandrinho renewed his link with Santos until December 2017, being also a regular during the campaign, appearing in 21 matches. He eventually lost his space in 2014, contributing with only eight league matches.

After appearing in even less matches in 2015, Leandrinho was about to go out on loan to Oeste on 3 June 2016, until December. The move later fell through, after both parts failed to agree terms.

Rio Ave
On 8 July 2016, Leandrinho was transferred to Portuguese Primeira Liga club Rio Ave, with Santos retaining part ownership.

Vitória de Setúbal
On 2 September 2019, Leandrinho signed a three-year contract with fellow top tier side Vitória de Setúbal.

Mafra
On 17 June 2021, he returned to Portugal and signed with Mafra.

Personal life
Leandrinho is the brother of the footballer Léo Cordeiro.

Career statistics

Honours
Santos
Recopa Sudamericana: 2012
Campeonato Paulista: 2015, 2016

References

External links
Santos FC official profile 

1993 births
Living people
Sportspeople from Minas Gerais
Brazilian footballers
Association football midfielders
Campeonato Brasileiro Série A players
Campeonato Brasileiro Série B players
Primeira Liga players
Liga Portugal 2 players
Santos FC players
Rio Ave F.C. players
Vitória F.C. players
Avaí FC players
C.D. Mafra players
Brazilian expatriate footballers
Brazilian expatriate sportspeople in Portugal
Expatriate footballers in Portugal